Abdul Khaleque (1 March 1927 – 10 June 2013) was the first Inspector General of Bangladesh Police from 17 April 1971 to 23 April 1973. He was first home secretary of Bangladesh.

Early life and career
Khaleque was born in a village named Jiruin under Brahmanpara Upzilla of District Comilla on 1 March 1927. He was also a member of Mukti Bahini.

Khaleque was one of the four founding members of Ain O Salish Kendro.

Personal life
Khaleque was married to Selina Khaleque.

References

External links
 

1927 births
2013 deaths
Inspectors General of Police (Bangladesh)
Pakistani MNAs 1955–1958
8th Jatiya Sangsad members
University of Dhaka alumni
Academic staff of the University of Dhaka